Hylettus is a genus of beetles in the family Cerambycidae, containing the following species:

 Hylettus alboplagiatus (White, 1855)
 Hylettus aureopilosus Monné, 1988
 Hylettus coenobita (Erichson, 1847)
 Hylettus eremita (Erichson, 1847)
 Hylettus excelsus (Bates, 1864)
 Hylettus griseofasciatus (Audinet-Serville, 1835)
 Hylettus hiekei Fuchs, 1970
 Hylettus magnus Monné, 1988
 Hylettus nebulosus Monné, 1982
 Hylettus paraleucus Monné, 1988
 Hylettus ramea (Bates, 1864)
 Hylettus seniculus (Germar, 1824)
 Hylettus spilotus Monné, 1982
 Hylettus stigmosus Monné, 1982

References

 
Acanthocinini